Chaney is a surname. Notable people with the surname include:

 Cassius Chaney (born 1987), American boxer
 Charles "Bubba" Chaney (born 1946), American politician
 Chris Chaney, American musician
 Darrel Chaney, American baseball player
 Don Chaney, American basketball player and coach
 Edward Chaney, Cultural historian
 Esty Chaney (1891–1952), American baseball player
 Fred Chaney, Australian Liberal Party politician and minister in the Fraser government (son of Fred snr)
 Fred Chaney Sr., Australian Liberal Party politician and minister in the Menzies government
 George Chaney (1892–1958), American boxer
 Gregory Chaney, American politician
 James Chaney (1943–1964), American civil rights activist
 James E. Chaney (1885–1967), American military officer
 James M. Chaney (1921–1976), American police officer and witness to President Kennedy's assassination
 James McDonald Chaney, American Presbyterian minister
 John Chaney (disambiguation) (several entries)
 Kate Chaney, Australian independent politician
 Lindsay Chaney, American news editor
 Lon Chaney (1883–1930), American actor
 Lon Chaney Jr. (1906–1973), American actor
 Michael Chaney, Australian businessman
 Mike Chaney (born 1944), Insurance Commissioner of Mississippi
 Norman Chaney (1918–1936), American child actor
 Olivia Chaney (born 1982) English folk singer
 Ralph Works Chaney (1890–1971) American paleobotanist.
 Tray Chaney, American actor
 William Chaney (1922–2013), American educator

Fictional characters
Markoff Chaney, a character from The Illuminatus! Trilogy

See also
Chanay
Cheney 
Chesney

French-language surnames